The 1937–38 Detroit Red Wings season was the 12th season for the Detroit NHL franchise, sixth as the Red Wings. The Wings finished last in the American Division and missed the playoffs.

On May 5 and 11, 1938, the Red Wings played post-season exhibition games against the Montreal Canadiens at Earlscourt Stadium in London, England.

Offseason

Regular season

Final standings

Record vs. opponents

Schedule and results

Playoffs
The Red Wings failed to make the playoffs

Player statistics

Regular season
Scoring

Goaltending

Note: GP = Games played; G = Goals; A = Assists; Pts = Points; +/- = Plus-minus PIM = Penalty minutes; PPG = Power-play goals; SHG = Short-handed goals; GWG = Game-winning goals;
      MIN = Minutes played; W = Wins; L = Losses; T = Ties; GA = Goals against; GAA = Goals-against average;  SO = Shutouts;

European tour

After failing to make the playoffs, the Red Wings embarked on a tour of Europe with the Montreal Canadiens. Prior to departure, the two teams played three exhibition games in Nova Scotia. In Europe, the teams played a nine-game series in England and France. The Canadiens won the series with a record of 5–3–1

Awards and records

Transactions

See also
1937–38 NHL season

References

External links
 

Detroit Red Wings seasons
Detroit
Detroit
Detroit Red Wings
Detroit Red Wings